March 26 – Eastern Orthodox liturgical calendar – March 28

All fixed commemorations below are observed on April 9 by Eastern Orthodox Churches on the Old Calendar.

For March 27th, Orthodox Churches on the Old Calendar commemorate the Saints listed on March 14.

Saints

 Prophet Hanani (Ananias) - (II Chronicles 16:7-10).
 Martyrs Philetas the Senator, his wife Lydia, their sons Macedon and Theoprepides, and Amphilochius, an officer in the army, with Chronidas, a notary (c. 121)  (see also: March 23)
 Venerable Matrona of Thessalonica the Confessor (3rd-4th centuries)
 Martyrs Baruch and John, by the sword.
 Venerable Eutychios, monastic.
 Venerable Cyricus (Quiricus) of Apros, in Thrace, monastic.
 Martyrs Manuel and Theodosius (304)
 Saint John the Clairvoyant, anchorite of Lycopolis, Egypt (394)
 Saint Paphnutius of Thebes, disciple of Saint Anthony the Great (4th century)  (see also: September 11)
 Saint Paul the Standard-bearer, Bishop of Corinth (c. 925)

Pre-Schism Western saints

 Saint Augusta, daughter of the Teuton Duke of Friuli, martyred by her father, venerated in Serravalle near Treviso (5th century)
 Saint Amator (Amador), a hermit to whom several churches are dedicated in Portugal.
 Saint Rupert of Salzburg, Bishop of Salzburg (718)
 Saint Romulus, Abbot of St Baudilius near Nîmes in France (c. 730)
 Saint Suairlech, first Bishop of Fore in Westmeath, Ireland, from c. 735-750 (c. 750)
 Saint Alkelda (Alkeld, Athilda), martyred by the Danes (10th century)

Post-Schism Orthodox saints

 Saint Ephraim of Rostov (1454)
 Saint Alexander, Abbot of Voche, near Galich (16th century)
 Saint Anthony (Stakhovsky), Metropolitan of Tobolsk in Siberia (1740)
 Saint Ambrose (Khelaia) the Confessor, Catholicos-Patriarch of All Georgia (1927)  (see also: March 16)

Other commemorations

 Icons of the Most Holy Theotokos on Mount Athos:
 "Glykophylousa" ("Sweet-kissing"), and 
 "Of the Akathist"
 Repose of Elder Augustine of Philotheou, Mt. Athos (1965)

Icon gallery

Notes

References

Sources
 March 27/April 9. Orthodox Calendar (PRAVOSLAVIE.RU).
 April 9 / March 27. HOLY TRINITY RUSSIAN ORTHODOX CHURCH (A parish of the Patriarchate of Moscow).
 March 27. OCA - The Lives of the Saints.
 The Autonomous Orthodox Metropolia of Western Europe and the Americas (ROCOR). St. Hilarion Calendar of Saints for the year of our Lord 2004. St. Hilarion Press (Austin, TX). p. 24.
 March 27. Latin Saints of the Orthodox Patriarchate of Rome.
 The Roman Martyrology. Transl. by the Archbishop of Baltimore. Last Edition, According to the Copy Printed at Rome in 1914. Revised Edition, with the Imprimatur of His Eminence Cardinal Gibbons. Baltimore: John Murphy Company, 1916. pp. 88–89.
 Rev. Richard Stanton. A Menology of England and Wales, or, Brief Memorials of the Ancient British and English Saints Arranged According to the Calendar, Together with the Martyrs of the 16th and 17th Centuries. London: Burns & Oates, 1892. p. 135.
Greek Sources
 Great Synaxaristes:  27 ΜΑΡΤΙΟΥ. ΜΕΓΑΣ ΣΥΝΑΞΑΡΙΣΤΗΣ.
  Συναξαριστής. 27 Μαρτίου. ECCLESIA.GR. (H ΕΚΚΛΗΣΙΑ ΤΗΣ ΕΛΛΑΔΟΣ). 
Russian Sources
  9 апреля (27 марта). Православная Энциклопедия под редакцией Патриарха Московского и всея Руси Кирилла (электронная версия). (Orthodox Encyclopedia - Pravenc.ru).
  27 марта (ст.ст.) 9 апреля 2013 (нов. ст.). Русская Православная Церковь Отдел внешних церковных связей. (DECR).

March in the Eastern Orthodox calendar